Oak Valley is an unincorporated community and census-designated place (CDP) located within Deptford Township in Gloucester County, New Jersey. As of the 2010 U.S. census, Oak Valley's population was 3,483.

Oak Valley and neighboring Pine Acres are located east of Route 45, isolated from the rest of Deptford Township, requiring residents to drive through the neighboring communities of Woodbury Heights or Wenonah to reach other destinations in the township. The neighborhood was built between the mid-1950s and 1963 on a combination of farmland, fruit orchards and the former grounds of the Forest View Country Club, later known as Oak Valley Country Club, which was a golf course that closed down during the Great Depression.

Geography
According to the U.S. Census Bureau, the CDP had a total area of 0.711 square miles (1.841 km2), including 0.707 square miles (1.831 km2) of land and 0.004 square miles (0.009 km2) of water (0.51%). It is located approximately 10 miles south of Philadelphia.

Demographics

Census 2010

Census 2000
As of the 2000 United States Census there were 3,747 people, 1,305 households, and 1,060 families residing in Oak Valley. The population density was 2,066.7/km2 (5,321.6/mi2). There were 1,322 housing units at an average density of 729.2/km2 (1,877.6/mi2). The racial makeup was 93.43% White, 4.06% African American, 0.27% Native American, 0.80% Asian, 0.27% from other races, and 1.17% from two or more races. Hispanic or Latino of any race were 2.24% of the population.

There were 1,305 households, out of which 36.3% had children under the age of 18 living with them, 63.4% were married couples living together, 12.3% had a female householder with no husband present, and 18.7% were non-families. 16.5% of all households were made up of individuals, and 8.0% had someone living alone who was 65 years of age or older. The average household size was 2.87 and the average family size was 3.20.

In Oak Valley the population was spread out, with 25.4% under the age of 18, 7.2% from 18 to 24, 31.8% from 25 to 44, 20.9% from 45 to 64, and 14.8% who were 65 years of age or older. The median age was 37 years. For every 100 females, there were 95.3 males. For every 100 females age 18 and over, there were 92.4 males.

The median income for a household was $50,746, and the median income for a family was $55,573. Males had a median income of $36,250 versus $25,350 for females. The per capita income for the CDP was $19,148. About 3.0% of families and 3.7% of the population were below the poverty line, including 3.7% of those under age 18 and 3.8% of those age 65 or over.

References

External links
 Deptford Township
 Oak Valley News

Census-designated places in Gloucester County, New Jersey
Deptford Township, New Jersey